The Hochstuckli (1,566 m) is a mountain of the Schwyzer Alps, overlooking Mostelberg in the canton of Schwyz.

In winter the mountain is part of a ski area. A ski-lift climbs to a height of 1,486 metres.

References

External links
 Hochstuckli on Hikr

 Hochstuckli Infos
 https://www.andrebueelermusik.ch/hochstuckli/

Mountains of the Alps
Mountains of the canton of Schwyz
Mountains of Switzerland